People v. Goetz, 68 N.Y.2d 96 (N.Y. 1986), was a court case chiefly concerning subjective and objective standards of reasonableness in using deadly force for self-defense; the New York Court of Appeals (the highest court in the state) held that a hybrid objective-subjective standard was mandated by New York law. 

The underlying case, involving the shooting of four black teenagers on a New York subway, was "one of the most controversial cases in recent American history". The shooting sparked a media frenzy, and Defendant Bernhard Goetz was both vilified and exalted in the press and in public opinion. 


Background

Factual background

The incident concerned a mass shooting that occurred in New York City on December 22, 1984. Four young black men (Troy Canty, Darryl Cabey, James Ramseur, and Barry Allen) boarded a New York City Subway car in the Bronx. The shooter, Bernhard Goetz, fled the scene and on December 31 surrendered himself to the police in New Hampshire. Goetz initially told police that, after firing four shots, he walked over to an injured Cabey and said, "You don't look so bad, here's another," before shooting him again; he later retracted this statement.

The case was presented to a Grand Jury, which returned an indictment on January 25, 1985, charging Goetz with one count of Criminal Possession of a Weapon in the Third Degree, and two counts of Criminal Possession of a Weapon in the Fourth Degree.  The Grand Jury dismissed charges of Attempted Murder, Assault, and Reckless Endangerment. The prosecutor later sought permission from the court to resubmit the case to another Grand Jury with additional evidence.  On March 27, 1985, the second Grand Jury returned an indictment charging Goetz with four counts of Attempted Murder, four counts of Assault, one count of Reckless Endangerment, and one count of Criminal Possession of a Weapon in the Third Degree. 

In January 1986, Judge Stephen Crane granted a motion by Goetz to dismiss these new indictments. Judge Crane held that the prosecutor had erroneously inserted an objective requirement to the self-defense justification when presenting the case to a grand jury; he further opined that two victims, Canty and Ramseur, had "strongly appeared" to have perjured themselves and that the admission of the prejudicial testimony had "severely undermined" the integrity of the grand jury. Although he did not specify the bases for his finding, the New York Times reported that it appeared to be based on alleged statements by Canty, Ramseur, and Cabey: According to police officer Peter Smith, who responded to the shooting, Canty told him that the group was planning to rob Goetz, but Goetz shot them first. (Police Commissioner Benjamin Ward said through a spokesman that he did not find Smith's account credible, saying it did "not make a great deal of sense.") Ramseur gave an interview to the Cable News Network saying he believed Goetz thought he was going to be robbed. And Cabey, while in the hospital, allegedly told New York Daily News reporter Jimmy Breslin that the other members of the group planned to rob Goetz because he "looked like easy bait" (though Cabey denied involvement himself).

The prosecution appealed the case. On April 17, 1986, the Appellate Division affirmed the decision of the lower court, prompting the appeal to the New York Court of Appeals.

Legal background: Self defense
Prior to 1961, New York's penal code required defendants asserting self defense to show that there was a "reasonable ground to apprehend a design on the part of the person slain to commit a felony, or to do some great personal injury to the slayer, and there [was] imminent danger of such design being accomplished." New York's courts interpreted that statute as requiring objective reasonableness. 

In 1961, the New York legislature updated its penal code. The update was spurred in part by the American Law Institute's release of the Model Penal Code—a document meant to inspire changes to state penal codes. As to defendants accused of intentional or attempted murder, the Model Penal Code suggested that an actor should only need to show that he "believe[d] that [the use of deadly force] was necessary" to avoid death or serious bodily injury—a wholly subjective test. New York's updated self-defense statute borrowed significantly from the Model Penal Code, but the word "reasonably" was inserted before "believe". That is, a jury was required to find that the actor "reasonably believe[d]" his or her use of force was necessary to protect the actor from death, serious injury, or specified crimes.

In response to the 1961 updates, a split emerged among New York's lower courts: some of those courts began interpreting the justification statute as being consistent with the Model Penal Code—requiring only a subjective belief. Judge Crane adopted that logic in his decision, and an appellate division affirmed his dismissal.

Opinion of the Court
Judge Sol Wachtler wrote for a unanimous court overturning Judge Crane's dismissal. The Court held that the requirement of "reasonabl[e] belie[f]" in the statutory text entailed an objective element, continuing to align New York with the majority of states.

With respect to the lower court's alternate theory for dismissal, the perjury issue, the Court found that the ground could be "rejected more summarily." The Court first noted that the evidence indicating that perjury may have been committed was not dispositive, finding, "[A]ll that has come to light is hearsay evidence that conflicts with part of Canty's testimony." As such, the Court held that dismissal was not warranted, as, "[t]here is no statute or controlling case law requiring dismissal of an indictment merely because, months later, the prosecutor becomes aware of some information which may lead to the defendant's acquittal."

Having reversed the lower court on both grounds, the Court reinstated all counts of the indictment.

Aftermath
Goetz was acquitted of the attempted-murder and first-degree-assault charges and convicted of criminal possession of a weapon in the third degree–for carrying a loaded, unlicensed weapon in a public place. Goetz was originally sentenced to six months in jail, one year's psychiatric treatment, five years' probation, 200 hours community service, and a $5,000 fine. However, in November 1988, an appellate court overturned this sentence, finding that the state's gun laws required, at minimum, a one-year sentence. Goetz requested that the appellate court overturn the conviction entirely, arguing that the judge's jury instructions improperly discouraged jury nullification, but the appellate division and New York Court of Appeals disagreed. On remand, Judge Crane sentenced Goetz to one-year incarceration and a $5,000 fine. Goetz ultimately served eight months.

One of the victims of the shooting, Darrell Cabey, who remained paralyzed, sued Goetz, represented by Ron Kuby, who had previously defended Long Island Rail Road mass murderer Colin Ferguson. The jury found in favor of Cabey and awarded him the sum of $18,000,000 in compensatory damages and $25,000,000 in punitive damages.

Goetz declared bankruptcy in 1996, freeing himself from  an estimated $16m in legal debts, but not from the $43m judgment.

References

Explanatory Notes

Citations

External links
 Transcript People v. Goetz

New York (state) state case law
U.S. state criminal case law
1986 in United States case law
1986 in New York (state)